Bethnal Green South West was a constituency in London. It returned one Member of Parliament (MP)  to the House of Commons of the Parliament of the United Kingdom.

It was created for the 1885 general election and abolished for the 1950 general election, when it was combined with Bethnal Green North East to form a new Bethnal Green constituency, reflecting the area's substantial fall in population.

Boundaries 

The constituency consisted of the south and west wards of the civil parish of Bethnal Green, Middlesex (later the Metropolitan Borough of Bethnal Green in the County of London).

1885-1918: The South and West wards of the parish of St. Matthew, Bethnal Green.

Members of Parliament

Election results

Elections in the 1880s

Election in the 1890s

Election in the 1900s

Election in the 1910s

Election in the 1920s

Election in the 1930s

Election in the 1940s

References

 Bethnal Green Parliamentary Representation at British History online
 

Politics of the London Borough of Tower Hamlets
Parliamentary constituencies in London (historic)
Constituencies of the Parliament of the United Kingdom established in 1885
Constituencies of the Parliament of the United Kingdom disestablished in 1950
Bethnal Green